Lac Chambon is a lake in Puy-de-Dôme, France. At an elevation of 877 m, its surface area is 0.6 km².

Chambon